Salutes Bessie Smith is the second album by American pianist Amina Claudine Myers featuring performances recorded in 1980 for the Leo label.

Reception
The Allmusic review by Michael G. Nastos awarded the album 4½ stars stating "Vocal perfection and landmark recording for this keyboardist and singer. Desert island music".

Track listing
All compositions by Amina Claudine Myers except as indicated
 "Wasted Life Blues" (Bessie Smith) - 6:58 
 "Dirty No-Gooder's Blues" (Smith) - 4:13 
 "Jailhouse Blues" (Smith) - 6:43 
 "It Makes My Love Come Down" (Smith) - 3:50 
 "The Blues [Straight to You]" - 7:10 
 "African Blues" - 14:44 
Recorded at Big Apple Recording Studios in New York City on June 19 & 22, 1980

Personnel
Amina Claudine Myers - piano, organ, voice
Cecil McBee - bass
Jimmy Lovelace - drums, bells

References

Leo Records albums
Amina Claudine Myers albums
1980 albums